Katharina Hechler (born 10 March 2000) is a German professional racing cyclist, who most recently rode for UCI Women's Continental Team . In August 2020, she rode in the 2020 Strade Bianche Women's race in Italy.

References

External links
 

2000 births
Living people
German female cyclists
People from Speyer
Cyclists from Rhineland-Palatinate
21st-century German women